Parish of Urisino, New South Wales located at  is a cadastral parish of Ularara County New South Wales.

History
The Burke and Wills expedition were the first Europeans to the area, passing a few miles to the west.

Climate 
The climate is semi-arid, featuring low rainfall, very hot summer temperatures and cool nights in winter. 
 The parish has a Köppen climate classification of BWh (Hot desert). Major features of the parish include Mulghany Creek(a tributary of the Paroo River, Feeder Creek and the cut line road.

References

Parishes of Ularara County
Far West (New South Wales)